The 2020 Oceania Taekwondo Qualification Tournament for Tokyo Olympic Games took place in Gold Coast, Queensland, Australia. The tournament was held on 29 February 2020.  Each country may enter a maximum of 2 male and 2 female divisions with only one athlete in each division. The winners per division qualify for the Olympic Games under their NOC.

Qualification summary

Results

Men

−58 kg
  qualified automatically.

−68 kg

−80 kg

+80 kg

Women

−49 kg
 Cancelled due to no entries.

−57 kg

−67 kg
  qualified automatically.

+67 kg

References

Draw
Results

External links
 World Taekwondo Federation

Olympic Qualification
Taekwondo Olympic Qual
Taekwondo qualification for the 2020 Summer Olympics
2020 in Australian sport
Oceania Taekwondo Olympic Qualification Tournament
Sports competitions on the Gold Coast, Queensland